Progress and Modern Democracy ( PDM) was a French centrist political group of the National Assembly elected in 1968 after the May 1968 crisis. It was composed of the Christian democrat deputies belonging to the Democratic Centre and the conservatives of the National Centre of Independents and Peasants.

Defunct political parties in France
Parliamentary groups in France
Centrist parties in France
Christian democratic parties in Europe